High Desert Elite FC is an American soccer team based in the Adelanto, California that plays in the United Premier Soccer League.

History

High Desert Elite FC was formed in 2018. It was the second attempt at fielding a team in Adelanto, after the High Desert Fury were announced in 2017, but later folded. They joined the National Premier Soccer League, a tier four league, to begin play in the 2019 season. They play out of Adelanto Stadium, a multi-purpose facility, that they shared with baseball team, High Desert Yardbirds until 2019. They played their first home match on March 3, in front of a large crowd of over 1200 fans, losing 3–0 to Temecula FC. In the fall of 2021 High Desert Elite FC tied 3–3 against Inland Empire FC in a friendly match, HD Elite FC played Inland Empire FC for a second time again with a 2-2 tied result which helped the team prepare for the upcoming season. High Desert Elite FC joined the United Premier Soccer League Premier Division with a comfortable 3–0 victory over OC Spartans Academy in their first home match on Aug 28, 2021.

Year-by-Year

Players and Staff

Current Roster 

[Official roster not released yet]*

Fall Season Schedule 2021-2022

Notable players 
High Desert Elite FC start the United Premier Soccer League Fall Season 2021–22 with notable players such as Carlos Cruz and Marcus Aragon as the team captains. Both High Desert Elite FC captains have previously played with High Desert Elite FC in the previous UPSL and NPSL season, captain of the team Carlos Cruz brings his experience in Spain to help High Desert Elite FC hope for a better season than 2020-21 where they ended at the bottom of the leaderboard. Douglas Rodriguez from El Salvador is High Desert Elite FC current Forward and top scorer, Douglas Rodriguez has an incredible talent for freekicks with speed and precision, UPSL goalies must be on high alert when High Desert Elite FC #10 position himself ready for a freekick. Guatemalan native Kevin Gonzalez joins High Desert Elite FC for the Fall 2021–22 season previously played for Colorado Springs FC in the Mountain Premier League in the Spring 2019–20 season, young Guatemalan player developed as a winger player with an incredible accurate right foot, Kevin stood out in the Mountain Premier League as one of the top assisters in the Spring season 2019–20 with set pieces, lastly Kevin played as a winger when representing TSV Obernzenn in the tier 4 Regionalliga Bayern. Peter Zequeida is High Desert Elite FC main goalie as he played as starting goalie during the NPSL season in which High Desert Elite FC participated, coaches from higher U.S Soccer division such as NISA with the likes of LA Force FC and Cal United Strikers FC teams keeping their eye on these players who show promise and could be capable of playing at higher levels in the American soccer pyramid. The experience, versatility, speed, and value these players bring to High Desert Elite FC will be one to be on the look for as High Desert Elite FC takes on the UPSL Fall Season 2021–22.

Interviews 
The Inception behind High Desert Elite FC

High Desert Elite FC head coach and manager Fidel Gonzalez in an open interview shared about his own football story, the struggles and challenges of High Desert Elite FC and what he hopes to achieve in the high desert area.

References
https://premier.upsl.com/standings Fall 2021-22 United Premier Soccer League standings* 

2018 establishments in California
Association football clubs established in 2018
Soccer clubs in California
National Premier Soccer League teams